Name the Woman is a 1928 American silent drama film directed by Erle C. Kenton and starring Anita Stewart, Huntley Gordon and Gaston Glass. The film's sets were designed by the art director Joseph C. Wright. The studios's 1934 sound film of the same title is not a remake.

Synopsis
A man on trial for murder is cleared when the wife of the prosecuting attorney reveals that she is his alibi having spent the night of Mardis Gras, when the killing occurred,  with him. Realising that his neglect of his wife is to blame, the lawyer resigns from public office.

Cast
 Anita Stewart as Florence 
 Huntley Gordon as Marshall 
 Gaston Glass as Joe Arnold 
 Chappell Dossett as Judge 
 Julanne Johnston as Nina Palmer 
 Jed Prouty as Sam Palmer

References

Bibliography
 Munden, Kenneth White. The American Film Institute Catalog of Motion Pictures Produced in the United States, Part 1. University of California Press, 1997.

External links
 

1928 films
1928 drama films
1920s English-language films
American silent feature films
Silent American drama films
American black-and-white films
Columbia Pictures films
Films directed by Erle C. Kenton
1920s American films